Yang Jintong is a Chinese competitive swimmer. He won the gold medal in the 800 meter freestyle at the 2015 FINA World Junior Swimming Championships in Singapore. He also won the silver medal in the 400 meter freestyle behind Grant Shoults.

In 2014 at the 2nd FINA World Junior Open Water Swimming Championships in Balatonfüred, Hungary, Yang won the silver medal in the 5 km youth event. Together with his teammates Qiao Zhongyi and Yan Siyu, he won the gold medal in the mixed team event.

At the senior 2015 Chinese Championships in Huangshan, Yang finished second in the 400-meter freestyle, behind reigning Olympic champion Sun Yang.

References

1998 births
Living people
Chinese male freestyle swimmers
Male long-distance swimmers
Asian Games medalists in swimming
Asian Games silver medalists for China
Medalists at the 2018 Asian Games
Swimmers at the 2018 Asian Games
20th-century Chinese people
21st-century Chinese people